Sean Naohiko Patrick Lovemore (born 8 June 1992) is a New Zealand footballer who currently plays for Auckland United in the NRFL Premier.

Club career 
On 8 February 2011 he was signed on loan by A-League club Wellington Phoenix from local New Zealand outfit Waitakere United and made his professional debut in the A-League on 9 February 2011 in a round 26 clash against Sydney FC coming of the bench in the 65th minute of the game in a 2–0 loss.

International career
In 2011 Lovemore travelled with the New Zealand under 20 side to the 2011 FIFA U-20 World Cup in Colombia where he made two appearances.

A-League career statistics

References

External links
 
 HBU profile

1992 births
Living people
New Zealand association footballers
Waitakere United players
A-League Men players
Wellington Phoenix FC players
Hawke's Bay United FC players
Auckland United FC players
Association footballers from Auckland
Association football forwards
New Zealand Football Championship players